Rains Independent School District is a public school district based in Emory, Texas (USA).

In addition to Emory, the district serves most of Rains County, including the cities of Point and East Tawakoni.

In 2009, the school district was rated "recognized" by the Texas Education Agency.

Schools
Rains High School (Grades 9-12)
Rains Junior High School (Grades 6-8)
Rains Intermediate School (Grades 4-5)
Rains Elementary School (Grades PK-3)

State Championships
2018-2019: Softball (Conference 3A), Coach: Scott Delozier
2020-2021: Softball (Conference 3A), Coach: Scott Delozier

State Appearances
1983-1984: Volleyball (Conference 2A),  State Semi-finalist
1983-1984: Baseball (Conference 2A), State Semi-finalist
2017-2018: Softball (Conference 4A), State Semi-finalist
2018-2019: Softball (Conference 3A), State Champions
2020-2021: Softball (Conference 3A), State Champions

See also
List of school districts in Texas

References

External links
 Rains Independent School District

School districts in Rains County, Texas